Tie The Knot (foaled 1994 - Died October 2012) was an Australian-bred Thoroughbred racehorse who won 13 Group One races. In 1999-2000, he was voted Australian Champion Stayer and in 2021 was inducted into the Australian Racing Hall of Fame.

Breeding
Tie the Knot was a chestnut gelding sired by Nassipour (USA) from Whisked by Whiskey Road (USA). Nassipour was also the sire of Let's Elope (NZ), who won the Melbourne Cup, Mackinnon Stakes and Caulfield Cup. Tie the Knot was bred and raced by Mr O.P. Tait and Mrs S.S. Nivison. He was a half brother to the stakes winner Dream Ballad by Singspiel (IRE) and eight other named horses.  Their dam, Whisked, won three group races and almost A$550,000, including the VATC One Thousand Guineas. She died on 29 September 2009 from complications after producing a live filly by Strategic.

Racing career
Tie the Knot won the Sydney Cup in both 1998 and 1999 and captured the Group one Chipping Norton Stakes in four consecutive years between 1999 and 2002.

He retired from racing with a record of 21 wins and 17 minor placings and earnings of A$6,212,835 from his 62 starts. His total of 13 group one wins has been topped in Australasia only by Black Caviar's 15 wins, Kingston Town's 14 and is equal to Sunline's. The only other horses to better his number of G1 wins are Winx John Henry with 16 wins and Forego with 14 wins. His winnings in stake money places him behind Winx Redzel Makybe Diva (GB), Sunline (NZ) and Northerly on the all-time Australasian list.

Tie the Knot was voted the 1999-2000 Australian Champion Stayer.

Race record

Pedigree

See also
List of leading Thoroughbred racehorses
List of millionaire racehorses in Australia
Repeat winners of horse races

References

External links
 Tie the Knot

1994 racehorse births
2012 racehorse deaths
Racehorses bred in Australia
Racehorses trained in Australia
Sydney Cup winners
Thoroughbred family 18
Australian Racing Hall of Fame horses